In Greek mythology, Aeolus, the son of Hippotes, was the ruler of the winds encountered by Odysseus in Homer's Odyssey.  Aeolus was the  king of the island of Aeolia, where he lived with his wife and six sons and six daughters. To ensure safe passage home for Odysseus and his men, Aeolus gave Odysseus a bag containing all the winds, except the gentle west wind. But when almost home, Odysseus' men, thinking the bag contained treasure, opened it and they were all driven by the winds back to Aeolia. Believing that Odysseus must evidently be hated by the gods, Aeolus sent him away without further help.  This Aeolus was also sometimes confused with the Aeolus who was the son of Hellen and the eponym of the Aeolians.

Family
All that Homer's Odyssey tells us about Aeolus' family is that his father was Hippotes, that he had six sons and six daughters, that Aeolus gave his six daughters to his six sons as wives, and that Aeolus, his wife, and all their children lived happily together on the idyllic island paradise of Aeolia. In Euripides' lost tragedy Aeolus, one of Aeolus' six sons is named Macareus, and one of his six daughters is named Canace (also the name of one of the five daughters of Aeolus son of Hellen).

The Byzantine poet John Tzetzes (c. 1110–1180) gives the following names for Aeolus' children: the sons Periphas, Agenor, Euchenor, Klymenos, Xouthos and Macareus, and daughters Klymene, Kallithyia, Eurygone, Lysidike, Kanake and an unnamed one.

Mythology

Ruler of the winds

According to Homer, Aeolus the son of Hippotes was the king of the floating island of Aeolia, whom Zeus had made the "keeper of the winds, both to still and to rouse whatever one he will." In Apollonius of Rhodes's Argonautica, at the request of Hera, he calmed all the winds but the "steady" west wind, to aid Jason and the Argonauts on their journey home.

In Virgil's Aeneid,  Aeolus keeps the winds contained in a cave on Aeolia:

Because of her hatred of the Trojans, Juno (the Roman equivalent of the Greek Hera) pleads with Aeolus to destroy Aeneas' ships, promising to give Aeolus the nymph Deiopea as wife. So Aeolus unleashed his winds against Aeneas. But Neptune, angry at this usurpation of his sovereignty over the sea, commands the winds to:

Neptune then quelled the monstrous waves that Aeolus' winds had stirred up, and Aeneas was saved.

Encounter with Odysseus
In Homer's Odyssey, Odysseus and his men, after escaping from the Cyclops Polyphemus, came next to the island of Aeolia:

Aeolus entertained Odysseus and his men for a month, questioning Odysseus about all that had happened to him. When Odysseus was ready to set sail again for home, Aeolus gave him a bag made of oxhide in which he had bound "the blustering winds", all except for the west wind, which Aeolus sent forth to bear Odysseus and his men safely home. But when they came within sight of Ithaca their home, Odysseus was overcome with sleep, and his men, thinking that the bag held gifts of gold and silver that Odysseus intended to keep for himself, opened the bag letting loose all the unruly winds which drove their ship all the way back to Aeolus' floating island. And when Odysseus asked again for help, Aeolus replied:

The same story is also recounted by Hyginus, Ovid, and Apollodorus.

Aeolia

In the Odyssey, Aelolus' kingdom of Aeolia was purely mythical, a floating island surrounded by "a wall of unbreakable bronze". Later writers came to associate Aeolia with one of the Aeolian Islands, north of Sicily.

Confused with Aeolus son of Hellen
This Aeolus was sometimes confused (or identified) with Aeolus the son of Hellen and eponym of the Aeolians.  The confusion perhaps first occurs in Euripides' Aeolus, where, although clearly based on the Odyssey'''s Aeolus, Euripides' Aeolus is the father of a daughter Canace, like Aeolus the son of Hellen, and if the two are not identified, then they seem, at least, to be related. Hyginus, describes the Aeolus encountered by Odysseus as "Aeolus, son of Hellen". While Ovid, has the ruler of the winds, like Aeolus the son of Hellen, the father of a daughter Alcyone, as well as the tragic lovers Canace and Macareus, and calls Alcyone "Hippotades", ie. a descendant of Hippotes.

Diodorus Siculus' account
The rationalizing Greek historian Diodorus Siculus, explains how Aeolus came to be considered the ruler of the winds. According to Diodorus, Aeolus was said to be:

Diodorus Siculus—perhaps in order to resolve a confusion between this Aeolus and the Aeolus who was the son of Hellen—also made Aeolus's father Hippotes the son of a Mimas, who was the son of Aeolus the son of Hellen. And while Homer does not name Aeolus' mother, wife, or children, Diodorus supplies names for all but his daughters. According to Diodorus,  Aeolus' mother was Melanippe, his wife was Cyanê, and his six sons were Astyochus, Xuthus, Androcles, Pheraemon, Jocastus, and Agathyrnus.
 Gallery 

 Aeolus and Odysseus 

 Aeolus and Juno 

Other

See also
 Vayu, Hindu god of wind
 Rudra, the Vedic wind or storm God
 Fūjin, the Shinto Kami of winds

 Notes 

 References 
 Apollodorus, Apollodorus, The Library, with an English Translation by Sir James George Frazer, F.B.A., F.R.S. in 2 Volumes. Cambridge, Massachusetts, Harvard University Press; London, William Heinemann Ltd. 1921. . Online version at the Perseus Digital Library.
 Apollonius of Rhodes, Apollonius Rhodius: the Argonautica, translated by Robert Cooper Seaton, W. Heinemann, 1912. Internet Archive.
 Collard, Christopher and Martin Cropp, Euripides Fragments: Aegeus–Meleanger,  Loeb Classical Library No. 504, Cambridge, Massachusetts, Harvard University Press, 2008. . Online version at Harvard University Press.
 Diodorus Siculus, Library of History, Volume III: Books 4.59-8, translated by C. H. Oldfather, Loeb Classical Library No. 340. Cambridge, Massachusetts, Harvard University Press, 1939. . Online version at Harvard University Press. Online version by Bill Thayer.
 Gantz, Timothy, Early Greek Myth: A Guide to Literary and Artistic Sources, Johns Hopkins University Press, 1996, Two volumes:  (Vol. 1),  (Vol. 2).
 Grimal, Pierre, The Dictionary of Classical Mythology, Wiley-Blackwell, 1996. . Internet Archive.
 Hard, Robin, The Routledge Handbook of Greek Mythology: Based on H.J. Rose's "Handbook of Greek Mythology", Psychology Press, 2004, . Google Books.
 Homer, The Odyssey with an English Translation by A.T. Murray, PH.D. in two volumes. Cambridge, Massachusetts, Harvard University Press; London, William Heinemann, Ltd. 1919. Online version at the Perseus Digital Library.
 Hyginus, Gaius Julius, Fabulae, in The Myths of Hyginus, edited and translated by Mary A. Grant, Lawrence: University of Kansas Press, 1960. Online version at ToposText.
  Kerényi, Karl, The Gods of the Greeks,  Thames and Hudson, London, 1951. Internet Archive.
 Nauck, Johann August, Tragicorum graecorum fragmenta, Leipzig, Teubner, 1889. Internet Archive.
 Parthenius, Love Romances translated by Sir Stephen Gaselee (1882-1943), S. Loeb Classical Library Volume 69. Cambridge, MA. Harvard University Press. 1916.  Online version at the Topos Text Project.
 Ovid, The Epistles of Ovid, translated into English prose, as near the original as the different idioms of the Latin and English languages will allow; with the Latin text and order of construction on the same page; and critical, historical, geographical, and classical notes in English, from the very best commentators both ancient and modern; beside a very great number of notes entirely new; London. J. Nunn, Great-Queen-Street; R. Priestly, 143, High-Holborn; R. Lea, Greek-Street, Soho; and J. Rodwell, New-Bond-Street, 1813. Online version at the Perseus Digital Library.
 Ovid, Metamorphoses, Brookes More, Boston, Cornhill Publishing Co. 1922. Online version at the Perseus Digital Library.
 Parada, Carlos, Genealogical Guide to Greek Mythology, Jonsered, Paul Åströms Förlag, 1993. .
 Rose, H. J., s.v. Aeolus in the Oxford Classical Dictionary, second edition,  Hammond, N.G.L. and Howard Hayes Scullard (editors), Oxford University Press, 1992. .
 Virgil, Aeneid, Theodore C. Williams. trans. Boston. Houghton Mifflin Co. 1910. Online version at the Perseus Digital Library.
 Smith, William, Dictionary of Greek and Roman Biography and Mythology, London (1873). Online version at the Perseus Digital Library.
 Strabo, Geography, translated by Horace Leonard Jones; Cambridge, Massachusetts: Harvard University Press; London: William Heinemann, Ltd. (1924). LacusCurtis, Online version at the Perseus Digital Library, Books 6–14.
 Tripp, Edward, Crowell's Handbook of Classical Mythology, Thomas Y. Crowell Co; First edition (June 1970). .
 Tzetzes, John, Allegories of the Odyssey, translated by Adam J. Goldwyn, and Dimitra Kokkini, Harvard University Press, Cambridge, Massachusetts, London, England, 2019. .
 Virgil, Aeneid'', Theodore C. Williams. trans. Boston. Houghton Mifflin Co. 1910. Online version at the Perseus Digital Library.

Greek gods
Wind gods
Kings in Greek mythology
Characters in the Odyssey
Characters in the Aeneid
Deeds of Zeus